Brian Carlos Castaño (born 12 September 1989) is an Argentine professional boxer. He held the WBO light middleweight title between February 2021 to May 2022 and previously held the WBA interim light middleweight title from 2016 to 2018, and the WBA (Regular) light middleweight title from 2018 to 2019. As of November 2020, he is ranked as the world's fifth best active light middleweight by The Ring magazine, the Transnational Boxing Rankings Board and third by BoxRec.

Early life and amateur career
Castaño started boxing at 11, trained by his father Carlos, who was also a professional boxer. Castaño won a South American Games gold medal and tallied a 181–5–5 record as an amateur, with wins over Errol Spence Jr. and Esquiva Falcão. Castaño participated in the 2009 World Amateur Boxing Championships, winning his first two bout before losing to Jack Culcay-Keth. He also represented Argentina in the World Series of Boxing. Castaño accumulated a 3–0 record in the World Series, including a famous win over Sergiy Derevyanchenko, who had previously been unbeaten in the competition.

Professional career

Early career 
Castaño made his professional debut in September 2012, months after his win over Derevianchenko. He beat Alejandro Antonio Dominguez with a round 4 technical knockout at Luna Park. Castaño won his first 8 fights, 7 by way of knockout, before being sidelined due to an arrhytmia which caused several medical complications. After recovering, Castaño relocated to the United States. Castaño maintained his winning streak, winning four fights over the course of a year while fighting out of the U.S.

Rise up the ranks 
In November 2016, Castaño fought Emmanuel de Jesús for the WBA interim super welterweight title. After knocking De Jesús down on round 1 with a flurry of punches, Castaño went down at the beginning of round 2, following a cross from De Jesús. Castaño survived the round and as the fight went on, De Jesús started slowing down. Castaño eventually won the fight with a body shot towards the end of round 6.

Castaño stepped up against former world title challenger and long-time contender, Michel Soro. Castaño won a close fight by split decision (115–113, 115–113, 112–116). The judges seemed to prefer Castaño's activity and consistency over Soro's calculated pressure, who admitted he had started slow in a post-fight interview. Two months after the fight, Castaño said that Soro's promoter, Univent, had yet to pay most of his purse.

WBA (Regular) light middleweight champion

Castaño vs. Vitu 
After Demetrius Andrade vacated his WBA (Regular) title, the WBA elevated Castaño to regular champion. Shortly thereafter, the WBA ordered a fight between Castaño and WBA (Super) champion, Erislandy Lara. Castaño would first face Cedric Vitu on 10 March 2018. Castaño showcased his talent, and defeated Vitu via a 12th-round TKO, dominating him from start to finish to retain his WBA (Regular) title.

Castaño vs. Lara 
On 2 March 2019, Castaño defended his title against former world champion Erislandy Lara. The fight ended in a split draw, one judge scoring it 115–113 for Castaño, one judge scoring it 115–113 for Lara while the third had it 114–114.

On June 25, 2019, the WBA announced that they are stripping Castaño of his belt, because he did not sign the contract for a rematch against Cedric Vitu, his immediate mandatory challenger.

In his next fight, Castaño faced veteran Wale Omotoso. The fight was a one-sided affair in favor of Castaño, up until the end of the fifth round, in which Omotoso declared a shoulder injury was too painful to proceed, awarding Castaño with the victory.

WBO light middleweight champion

Castaño vs. Teixeira 
On 13 February 2021, Castaño defeated WBO light middleweight champion Patrick Teixeira via wide unanimous decision with judges' scores of 119–109, 120–108 and 117–111 in his favor.

Castaño vs. Charlo 

Castaño faced unified light middleweight champion Jermell Charlo on 17 July 2021 in San Antonio, Texas in a showdown for the undisputed light middleweight championship. A competitive fight between them ended in a split draw, the second of Castaño's career, with scores of 117–111 Charlo, 114–113 Castaño and 114–114 even. The result was controversial, with much attention being brought to judge Nelson Vazquez's 117–111 Charlo card, which was described as "terrible" by Andre Ward. After the fight, an upset Castaño opined, "[Charlo] won the second, tenth and eleventh [rounds], that’s it... I don’t agree with [the result]. I felt I was robbed, and I demand a rematch."

Castaño vs. Charlo II 
On November 27, 2021, it was revealed by ESPN that Castaño and Charlo had agreed to face each other in a rematch. The fight was officially announced on February 8, 2022, and was supposed to take place on March 19. Castaño was forced to withdraw on February 17 however, after suffering a slight biceps tear during training camp. A day later, the WBO ordered Castaño to show cause as to why Charlo should't be rescheduled to make an overdue mandatory title defense against Tim Tszyu. The fight was granted sanctioning approval by the WBO on May 3, under the condition that it takes place by May 14. The bout was officially announced for May 14, 2022, and took place at the Dignity Health Sports Park in Carson, California. He lost by 10th-round knockout after being knocked down twice. He was down on all three of the judges' scorecards at the time of the stoppage, with scores of 84–87, 83–88 and 82–89.

Professional boxing record

See also
List of world light-middleweight boxing champions

References

External links

Brian Castaño - Profile, News Archive & Current Rankings at Box.Live

 

|-

1989 births
Living people
Argentine male boxers
Light-middleweight boxers
World light-middleweight boxing champions
World Boxing Association champions
World Boxing Organization champions
South American Games gold medalists for Argentina
South American Games medalists in boxing
Competitors at the 2010 South American Games
People from La Matanza Partido
Sportspeople from Buenos Aires Province